Jussi Ilmari Karvinen, better known as Jussifer, is a Finnish-American record producer, songwriter and musician. He has worked with Kelly Clarkson, Bebe Rexha, JoJo, Alma and Dinah Jane. He also penned a track for the Spanish animated film Klaus titled "Invisible", which earned him a nomination at the 34th Goya Awards.

Production discography

References

Finnish record producers
Finnish songwriters
21st-century American male musicians
21st-century Finnish musicians
American male songwriters
American people of Finnish descent
American record producers
Living people
1984 births